Clarisse Bogdanna Agbegnenou (born 25 October 1992) is a French judoka. Competing in the −63 kg weight division she won the European title in 2013, the world title in 2014, an Olympic silver medal in 2016, and an Olympic gold medal at the 2020 Summer Olympics in July 2021.

Life 
Agbegnenou was born to Togolese parents; she holds a dual citizenship and maintains strong ties to both countries. Togo's president Faure Gnassingbe personally congratulated her after she won the 2014 world title.

She was silver medalist at the 2016 Summer Olympics and gold medalist at the 2020 Summer Olympics.

Medals

Olympics
  Gold Medal at the 2020 Summer Olympics in Tokyo
  Silver Medal at the 2016 Summer Olympics in Rio de Janeiro

World Championships
  Gold Medal at the 2021 World Championships in Budapest.
  Gold Medal at the 2019 World Championships in Tokyo.
  Gold Medal at the 2018 World Championships in Baku.
  Gold Medal at the 2017 World Championships in Budapest.
  Gold Medal at the 2014 World Championships in Chelyabinsk.
  Silver Medal at the 2013 World Championships in Rio de Janeiro.
  Silver Medal at the 2015 World Championships in Astana.
  Team Gold Medal at the 2011 World Championships in Paris.
  Bronze Medal at the 2011 Junior World Championships.

European Championships
  Gold Medal at the 2020 European Championships in Prague.
  Gold Medal at the 2019 European Championships in Minsk.
  Gold Medal at the 2018 European Championships in Tel Aviv.
  2008 European Cadet Champion
  Bronze Medal at the 2012 European Championships in Chelyabinsk.
  Team Silver Medal at the 2012 European Championships in Chelyabinsk.
  Gold Medal at the 2013 European Championships in Budapest.

National French Championships
  Gold Medal at the 2012 National French Championships.
  Gold Medal at the 2010 National French Championships.
  Gold Medal at the 2009 National French Championships.

Miscellaneous
  Gold Medal at the 2020 Paris Grand Slam.
  Gold Medal at the 2019 Paris Grand Slam.
  Gold Medal at the 2018 Guangzhou World Masters.
  Gold Medal at the 2018 Paris Grand Slam.
  Gold Medal at the 2016 Paris Grand Slam.
  Gold Medal at the 2014 Paris Grand Slam.
  Gold Medal at the 2013 Paris Grand Slam.
  Gold Medal at the 2010 Tokyo Grand Slam.
  Gold Medal at the 2011 Abu Dhabi Grand Prix.
  Silver Medal at the 2019 Qingdao World Masters.
  Silver Medal at the 2012 Düsseldorf Grand Prix.
  Silver Medal at the 2010 Abu Dhabi Grand Prix.

References

External links

 
 
 
 

1992 births
Living people
Black French sportspeople
Sportspeople from Rennes
French sportspeople of Togolese descent
French female judoka
European Games gold medalists for France
European Games bronze medalists for France
European Games medalists in judo
Judoka at the 2015 European Games
Judoka at the 2016 Summer Olympics
Olympic judoka of France
Olympic medalists in judo
Medalists at the 2016 Summer Olympics
Olympic silver medalists for France
World judo champions
Judoka at the 2019 European Games
Judoka at the 2020 Summer Olympics
Medalists at the 2020 Summer Olympics
Olympic gold medalists for France
21st-century French women